Zawgyi may refer to:

 Zawgyi (alchemist), Burmese shaman or magician, skilled in Tantric lore
 Zawgyi (writer), Burmese poet and author
 Zawgyi dance, a dance in Burma
 Zawgyi font, a non-Unicode typeface for the Burmese script
 Zawgyi River, a river in Myanmar